Sherif Sabri Pasha, born in Cairo in 1895, was the brother of Nazli Sabri, Queen consort of Egypt. He was thus the maternal uncle of Nazli's son King Farouk I, and served on the three-member Regency Council that was formed in 1936-37 during the latter's minority. Sherif Pasha Sabri was 41 years old at the time, and had previously held the post of Undersecretary for Foreign Affairs.

Biography 
He was educated at Khedivial School of Law, in Cairo.

He was born in 1895, in Cairo. His other sister was Amina Sabri.

On 30 September 1946, Sherif Sabri Pasha was asked to become Prime Minister and head a new cabinet. However, he never became premier and Ismail Sidqi Pasha remained Prime Minister until 9 December 1946.

Sherif Sabri Pasha headed the Royal Egyptian Geographic Society from May 1946 till March 1955. Like his sisters Nazli and Amina, he was a grandson of Egypt's three-time prime minister Mohamed Sherif Pasha who was of Turkish origin, as well as a great-grandson of Napoleon Bonaparte's colonel Soliman Pasha al-Faransawi.

In 1922 he married Naila Khanum, only daughter of Adly Yeghen Pasha by his wife, Zainab Khanum.

Positions 
 Director-General of Ministry of Foreign Affairs (1925-1929).
 Under-Secretary of State (1929-1933).
 Envoy Extraordinary and Minister Plenipotentiary (1933-1936).
 Member of the Regency Council (1936-1937).
 President of the Royal Egyptian Geographic Society (1946-1955).
 President of the Supreme Council of the Arab Museum. 
 President of Egyptian Shipping Company.
 President of Egyptian Construction and Engineering Company.
 President of Nile Insurance Company.

See also
Sherif

References

1895 births
Year of death missing
Egyptian Muslims
20th-century Regents of Egypt
Regents of Egypt
Egyptian pashas
Egyptian people of French descent
Egyptian people of Greek descent
Egyptian people of Turkish descent
Grand Crosses of the Order of the Crown (Belgium)
Grand Crosses of the Order of the Dannebrog
Recipients of the Grand Decoration for Services to the Republic of Austria